The Grand Castle is a multi-family residential development in Grandville, Michigan with 520 apartment units. The Grand Castle's design was inspired by the Neuschwanstein Castle and it has been described as "the second largest castle structure in the world." (The largest castle in the world measured by land area is Malbork Castle in Poland).

History
After years of lower building proposals in the Grand Rapids metropolitan area, proposals and new construction began to increase to some of their highest rates in 2015 and 2016. In 2015, Roger Lucas, owner of Grand Castle, LLC, and the site's developer, submitted plans to the City of Grandville, Michigan for the Grand Castle.

The site was originally developed by La Grande LLC as the LaGrande Mobile Home Park in 1957,  which was one of the oldest mobile home developments in the area. LaGrande Mobile Home Park closed in 2005 to be marketed for redevelopment for highest and best use. Grand Castle LLC acquired the 23.6-acre site from La Grande LLC in May 2016  and planned for a Mixed Use Planned Unit Development (MPUD) of the Grand Castle.

In 2016, Grand Castle, LLC purchased 52-acre Sanford Lake, that adjoins the 23.6-acre development site. Sanford Lake was previously owned by Grand Rapids Gravel Company. Sanford Lake formed years ago when the local gravel company actively mined the area. Gravel mining operations at the location ended several years ago, making Sanford Lake a safe habitat for various species of wildlife, including ducks, geese, northern pike, largemouth bass, and many other animals.

As of August 2018, only 50 people had placed money deposits on the apartments, resulting in a less than 10% confirmed level of interest.

Design and construction
The origination of the Grand Castle is rooted from the owner's admiration of the Neuschwanstein Castle in Germany. Grand Castle's owner, Roger Lucas, said he and his family have visited the Bavarian castle "at least 10 times". The original proposal for the 23.6-acre site included a 10-story building with 356 multi-family units, though the final design is larger.  

Construction for the Grand Castle began in April 2016, with the castle passing the 100-foot mark on September 13, 2016. Construction materials include, but are not limited to concrete precast walls and siding, "Red Iron" roof trusses, and steel panel roofing. The Grand Castle now houses 508 multi-family units which range from studio to three-story penthouse. There are also plans for 750 covered parking spaces, a clubhouse, a resort-style swimming pool, dog park, and a community beach with fire pits. Additional recreation activities include swimming, fishing, or kayaking at Sanford Lake, a walking trail, and other amenities.

Michigan OSHA has conducted several inspections during construction.  These inspections resulted in 12 violations, nine of which were "serious."

Proposed Developments
Phase II of the Grand Castle's site development includes plans for an additional 104 residential units, situated in 13 carriage house buildings that contain 8 residential units each, around the Grand Castle's perimeter. In addition, Phase II includes building 64,500 square feet of office and retail space along frontage on 28th Street.

References

Castles in the United States
Residential buildings in Michigan